Lord Justice Collins can refer to:
Richard Collins, Baron Collins (1842–1911)
Lawrence Collins (born 1941)

See also
Andrew Collins (judge) (born 1942), known as Mr Justice Collins
Justice Collins (disambiguation)